Betta edithae is a species of gourami endemic to Indonesia where it occurs in Kalimantan, Sumatra and the Riau Archipelago. The specific name honours the German aquarist Edith Korthaus (1923-1987), who co-discovered this species with her husband Walter Foersch . Walter is honoured in the specific name of another species they discovered, Betta foerschi.

References

edithae
Taxa named by Jörg Vierke
Fish described in 1984